Litchfield is a surname. Notable people with the surname include:

Bruce Litchfield (1908–1995), Australian architect
David Litchfield (born 1975), British security researcher
Edward H. Litchfield (1914–1968), American educator
Electus D. Litchfield (1872–1952), American architect
Elisha Litchfield (1785–1859), Congressman from New York
Eric Litchfield (1920–1982), British footballer and sports journalist
Frederick Henry Litchfield (1832–1867), Australian explorer
Grace Denio Litchfield (1849–1944), American novelist, poet
Harriett Litchfield (1777–1854), British actress
Henrietta Litchfield (1843–1927), daughter of Charles Darwin
Jessie Litchfield (1883–1956), Australian author and pioneer
John Litchfield (1899–1918), American sailor
John Litchfield (politician) (1903–1993), British politician and Royal Navy officer
Max Litchfield (born 1995), British swimmer
Paul Litchfield, British physician
Paul W. Litchfield (1875–1959), American industrialist
Peter Litchfield (born 1956), British footballer
Phoebe Litchfield (born 2003), Australian cricketer
Richard Buckley Litchfield (1832–1903), British scholar and philanthropist
Rodney Litchfield (1939–2020), British actor

English toponymic surnames